Maurilio or Maurelio (Italian), Maurille (French) and Maurílio (Portuguese) are variations of the Latin name Maurilius. 

Maurilius
 Maurilius of Angers (died 426), bishop and saint
 Maurilius of Voghenza (died 670), bishop of the defunct diocese of Vicohabentina, martyred at Imola, feast day on 7 May
 Maurilius (died 1067), bishop of Rouen

Maurilio
 Maurilio Fossati (1876–1965), Italian cardinal
 Maurilio De Zolt (born 1950), Italian cross country skier
 Maurilio Mariani (born 1973), Italian pole vaulter

Maurílio
 Hélder Maurílio da Silva Ferreira (born 1988), Brazilian footballer
 Maurílio (born 1969), Brazilian football manager

External links
Cléverson Maurílio Silva (born 1969), Brazilian footballer
Maurílio Jorge Quintal de Gouveia (born 1932), Archbishop of Évora (1981–2008)

Italian masculine given names
Portuguese masculine given names